CBS News Radio, formerly known as CBS Radio News and historically known as the CBS Radio Network, is a radio network that provides news to more than 1,000 radio stations throughout the United States. The network is owned by Paramount Global.  It is the last of the three original national U.S. radio networks (CBS, NBC Radio Network and Mutual Broadcasting System) still operating and still owned by its parent company, even though CBS sold its owned and operated radio stations in 2017. The current NBC Radio Network is actually owned by iHeartMedia but licenses use of the NBC name and NBC's TV news reports.

CBS News Radio is one of the two national news services distributed by Skyview Networks, which transmits national news, talk, music and special event programs, in addition to local news, weather, video news and other information to radio and television stations, as well as traffic reporting services.

Background 

The network is the second-oldest unit of Paramount Global after Paramount Pictures. CBS Radio traces its roots to CBS's predecessor, United Independent Broadcasters, founded in 1927 with 47 network affiliates.  The next year, Columbia Records invested in the radio network, which was named the Columbia Phonographic Broadcasting System. Eventually, the record company pulled its backing from the struggling web. William S. Paley bought a half-interest in what became the Columbia Broadcasting System in 1928, and became its president. (In 1938, CBS bought its former parent, Columbia Records.) For more about the network's history, see CBS.

On February 2, 2017, CBS Corporation announced that its shareholders had acquired a majority stake in Entercom, whose corporate management will continue to oversee the company along with CBS's radio assets. The merger was approved on November 9, 2017, and was consummated on the 17th. The CBS News Radio network service will continue to be managed by CBS News.

On August 2, 2017, CBS announced that it had signed a contract with Skyview Networks for distribution of CBS News Radio. This went into effect January 1, 2018.

Programming

Stations and affiliates
Today, CBS News Radio is best known for its news and public affairs programming distributed to more than 500 affiliates, including flagship station WCBS in New York, and several other all-news and news-talk stations.  They include KNX in Los Angeles, WBBM in Chicago, KCBS in San Francisco, KRLD in Dallas, KYW in Philadelphia, WTOP-FM in Washington, WBZ in Boston, WWJ in Detroit, WCCO in Minneapolis, KXNT Las Vegas, KMOX in St. Louis, and WTIC in Hartford.

CBS News Radio offers hourly News-on-the-Hour newscasts (available in three- and six-minute versions) and a one-minute newscast at 31 minutes past the hour.  They are sent to member stations 24 hours a day, 7 days a week. In addition to the over-the-air product, reports and actualities are made available to affiliates via the network's Newsfeed service. Many of the aforementioned outlets make heavy use of the CBS network feed material throughout their broadcast day.

The network is home to the morning and evening editions of the CBS World News Roundup, U.S. broadcasting's oldest news series. The Roundup dates back to a special network broadcast on March 13, 1938, featuring live reports from Europe on Germany's annexation of Austria. Since 2010, Steve Kathan has anchored the morning show, which airs at 8am ET and 7am PT, while Jennifer Keiper hosts the evening edition at 7pm ET. Each Friday afternoon, the network also distributes the CBS News Weekend Roundup, an hour-long look at the top stories of the week, hosted by correspondent Allison Keyes.

News reporters and anchors
CBS News Radio has an impressive list of reporters around the world including Steve Futterman, Jim Krasula, Peter King, Steven Portnoy, Cami McCormick, Vicki Barker, Elaine Cobbe, Sabina Castelfranco and Robert Berger.

Mark Knoller was the network's long-time White House correspondent. Knoller often made additional appearances on CBS Television, especially if he is the day's pool reporter for the White House Press Corps. Knoller no longer filed radio reports after about 2011, transitioning to report mostly on twitter. He left CBS in 2020.

Features and news programs
In 2009, CBS launched a long-form late night talk program hosted by Jon Grayson, based at KMOX St. Louis, and a morning talk show hosted by Michael Smerconish, based at WPHT Philadelphia, on some of its owned-and-operated stations. CBS handled the syndication of Grayson's show itself, while syndication for Smerconish's show to non-CBS stations had been outsourced to Dial Global (which at that time was not involved with the CBS Radio Network itself). Grayson's show, Overnight America, also entered national syndication via Dial Global on January 30, 2012.  Smerconish discontinued the morning show in 2011 and Grayson's show ended its national distribution a few years later.

Three of CBS's television programs are currently simulcast over CBS News Radio affiliates; those are Face the Nation, 60 Minutes, and the CBS Evening News.  Some stations, including WCBS in New York and WBZ in Boston, air the entire Evening News.  In addition, the Late Show with David Letterman Top Ten List was also broadcast by the network in a short-form-feature format until the show's conclusion with David Letterman's retirement in 2015.

Other public-affairs features include CBS Healthwatch with Dr. Emily Senay, Raising Our Kids (formerly suffixed with in the 90s during that decade) with former WCBS morning anchor Pat Carroll, What's in the News, and "Eye on Washington," a daily look at goings on in the nation's capital. 

During the overnight hours, the CBS News streaming service carries a simulcast of CBS News Radio's top-of-the-hour reports.

In March 2021, CBS News Radio hired John Batchelor to host a nightly newsmagazine, Eye on the World. Batchelor had previously hosted an eponymous show that was syndicated through Westwood One and, before that, ABC Radio Networks.

Sports programs
Historically, the sports coverage now produced by Westwood One was branded as CBS Radio Sports and, like the news features, associated with the CBS Radio Network; however, after CBS began managing the original Westwood One in the mid-1990s, the sports broadcasts would come under the Westwood One banner (with both identities used in the late 1990s), a practice that would continue even after CBS stopped managing Westwood One in 2007. 

CBS launched a 24/7 sports radio network, "CBS Sports Radio" in fall 2012 through Cumulus Media Networks, owned by Cumulus Media (Cumulus Media Networks was merged into Westwood One in 2013, following Cumulus' acquisition of Westwood One).

Anchors 
Deborah Rodriguez - Weekday Mornings - New York
Steve Kathan - World News Roundup & Weekday Mid-days - New York
Monica Rix - Weekday Afternoons - New York
Jennifer Keiper - World News Roundup Late Edition & Weekday Evenings - Chicago
Jennifer Brown - CBS Connected Minute - New York
Tom Foty - Weekend Overnights - Washington
Wendy Gillette - Fill-in - New York

Reporters 
Cami McCormick - Pentagon and State Department
Steven Portnoy - White House
Stacy Lyn - Washington
Allison Keyes - Washington
Linda Kenyon - Washington
Christopher Cruise - Washington
Steve Dorsey – Washington Executive Editor
Jim Krasula - The Carolinas
Peter King - Orlando
Steve Futterman - Los Angeles
Mara Rubin - New York
Stephan Kauffman - Prescott, Arizona
Vicki Barker - London
Robert Berger - Jerusalem
Elaine Cobbe - Paris
Sabina Castelfranco - Rome
Lucy Craft - Tokyo
Adrienne Bard - Mexico City
Scott Mayman - Brisbane

Music and the Spoken Word 

While the network's World News Roundup is the longest-running news show on radio or TV in the U.S., the title of longest-running network radio show of any kind goes to another CBS Radio program—Music and the Spoken Word, a half-hour of music and inspirational thought featuring the Tabernacle Choir at Temple Square. It began on July 15, 1929 and currently airs each Sunday morning at 11:30 Eastern Time. (The longest running radio show of any kind is the Grand Ole Opry, broadcast on WSM in Nashville, Tennessee since November 28, 1925.)

All-news affiliates
These stations were formerly owned-and-operated by CBS Radio before November 17, 2017, and are now under ownership of Audacy, unless otherwise noted.

All-news affiliates of CBS News Radio, listed by market rank:

WCBS 880 AM: New York, New York (#1)
KNX 1070 AM: Los Angeles, California (#2)
WBBM 780 AM and WCFS-FM/105.9 FM: Chicago, Illinois (#3)
KCBS 740 AM and 106.9 FM: San Francisco, California (#4)
KRLD 1080 AM: Dallas, Texas (#5)
KYW 1060 AM and WPHI-FM/103.9 FM: Philadelphia, Pennsylvania (#8)
WTOP-FM 103.5 FM: Washington, DC (#9) (Hubbard Broadcasting)
WBZ 1030 AM: Boston, Massachusetts (#10) (iHeartMedia)
WWJ 950 AM: Detroit, Michigan (#11)

References

External links
CBS News Radio official website

CBS Radio networks
Paramount Global subsidiaries
Radio stations established in 1927